Hithaadhoo as a place name may refer to:
 Hithaadhoo (Baa Atoll) (Republic of Maldives)
 Hithaadhoo (Gaafu Alif Atoll) (Republic of Maldives)

See also
 Hithadhoo (disambiguation)